Gretchen Elizabeth Carlson (born June 21, 1966) is an American broadcast journalist, author, and television personality. Carlson appeared as the host of numerous television programs, most notably on the Saturday edition of The Early Show on CBS News from 2002 to 2005, Fox News's morning show Fox & Friends from 2005 to 2013, and The Real Story with Gretchen Carlson on Fox News from 2013 to 2016.

In July 2016, Carlson filed a lawsuit against then Fox News chairman and CEO Roger Ailes claiming sexual harassment. Subsequently, dozens of other women also stepped forward to accuse Ailes of harassment, and Ailes resigned under pressure. In September 2016, Carlson and 21st Century Fox settled the lawsuit reportedly for $20 million and Carlson received a public apology. Carlson was one of the first high publicity cases of 2016's #MeToo movement.

Carlson was named one of Time magazine's 100 Most Influential People In The World in 2017. She has written two bestselling books, her memoir, Getting Real, and the New York Times bestseller Be Fierce: Stop Harassment and Take Your Power Back.

About three decades after the former beauty pageant contestant was crowned Miss America 1989, Carlson served as chairwoman of the board of directors of the Miss America Organization from 2018 to 2019, implementing changes to shift the focus of the pageant from appearances to achievements. Also in 2019, she co-founded Lift Our Voices to ban non-disclosure agreements (NDAs) and forced arbitration clauses in employment agreements in the American workplace so that victims of sexual harassment, pay inequity, and workplace toxicity would not be forcibly silenced by them; she and other founders of the movement regard these tactics as retaliation against victims.

Carlson joined PEOPLE (the TV Show!) as a special contributor in October 2020. She focuses on stories that highlight everyday American heroes doing inspirational acts.

In February 2022, the U.S. Congress passed the Ending Forced Arbitration of Sexual Assault and Sexual Harassment Act, a law championed by Carlson which excludes sexual assault and sexual harassment complaints from arbitration clauses, including retroactively. On March 3, 2022, President Joe Biden signed the bill into law.

Early life and education 
Carlson was born in Coon Rapids, Minnesota, the daughter of Karen Barbara ( Hyllengren) and Lee Roy Carlson, one of four children. Her father studied business at Gustavus Adolphus College and later became owner/operator of Main Motor Sales, an automobile dealership started by her grandfather in 1919. Carlson, whose grandfather was a minister, is of Swedish descent through both parents. One of her childhood babysitters was Michele Bachmann, the future Republican congresswoman who ran for president.

Carlson's hometown of Anoka, Minnesota, calls itself the "Halloween Capital of the World" and hosts the state's second largest parade, of which Carlson served as grand marshal in 2004.

In her youth, Carlson was a violinist who performed on radio and television. She studied with Dorothy DeLay at the Juilliard School of Music in New York City, and with Mary West of the MacPhail Center For Music in Minneapolis. Carlson performed in several competitions, such as the Stulberg International String Competition, where she was a finalist in 1982, the American String Teachers Association, where she won second place in 1981 to Joshua Bell, who became a world famous concert violinist, and the Friends of Minnesota Orchestra, where she won in 1979, performing as a soloist with the Minnesota Orchestra as a prize at just thirteen years old. She attended Aspen Music Festival from 1976 to 1983, and was a member of the Greater Twin Cities Youth Symphony from 1980 to 1984. Carlson graduated from Anoka-Hennepin School District 11's Anoka High School, where she was the 1984 valedictorian.

Carlson was crowned Miss Minnesota in June 1988 and became Miss America 1989 on September 10, 1988. She was the first classical violinist to win those titles. Following Carlson's Miss America win, she was invited to meet President Ronald Reagan in the Oval Office. She made many television appearances during her year of service, including appearing on The David Letterman Show, where he jokingly asked her out on a date. After Carlson's appearance as a newscaster in a sketch on Bloopers and Practical Jokes with Ed McMahon and Dick Clark, television agents began calling, eventually launching her career in broadcast television.

Carlson graduated from Stanford University in 1990 with honors, where she studied organizational behavior. She spent a study-abroad period at Oxford University, studying the works of Virginia Woolf. She was a member of the Kappa Kappa Gamma sorority. Carlson planned to attend law school after Stanford and completed the LSAT exam, but instead focused on a career in broadcast journalism.

In September 2011, Carlson was named to the inaugural class of the Anoka High School Hall of Fame.

Career

Early career and CBS News

A year after becoming Miss America in 1989, Carlson secured a role on WRIC-TV, an ABC-affiliated television station serving Richmond, Virginia as a co-anchor on the network and political commentator. Style Weekly deemed it a coup for WRIC-TV at the time. In 1992, she joined WCPO-TV, serving Cincinnati, Ohio as a media commentator and remained at the station for a period of two years. She later worked at WOIO/WUAB in Cleveland, Ohio, where Carlson and her colleague Denise Dufala, became the first women to co-anchor a primetime major-market newscast.

Following her time in Cleveland, Carlson served as a weekend anchor and reporter for KXAS-TV in Dallas/Fort Worth, Texas, from 1998 to 2000.

In both Dallas and Cleveland, Carlson performed her own rendition of "The Star-Spangled Banner" on the violin for Major League Baseball games.

Carlson moved to the national television scene as a national correspondent in 2000 and in 2002, she became the co-anchor of the Saturday edition of The Early Show on CBS along with Russ Mitchell. Carlson frequently anchored the weekend edition of the CBS Evening News during her time at the network.

There were several cultural moments that Carlson reported on in her early career as a reporter including the Oklahoma City bombing and the O. J. Simpson murder case while at WOIO in Cleveland, and the Timothy McVeigh execution, the September 11 terrorist attacks, and various G7 Summit meetings while at CBS News.

Fox News
Carlson first appeared on Fox & Friends as a weekend substitute host in 2006. On September 25, 2006, after a shifting of anchors, which included E.D. Hill moving to the 10 a.m. hour of Fox News Live, Carlson became the anchor of Fox & Friends. She co-hosted with Steve Doocy and Brian Kilmeade for almost 8 years. In 2012, she walked off the set of Fox & Friends when on-air colleagues made offensive comment about women in the workplace. In 2013, Carlson admitted on Brian Kilmeade's radio show that Fox News female anchors were not allowed to wear pants. Despite dress code restrictions, Carlson was known for doing push-ups when military personnel were guests on the show. Carlson returned to Fox and Friends in 2014 during a Cooking With Friends segment with her children and again in 2015 to promote her memoir Getting Real.

Carlson left Fox & Friends in September 2013 to anchor a one-hour daytime program, The Real Story with Gretchen Carlson, beginning in the fall of 2013, taking part of the slot opened by Megyn Kelly's move to primetime. She began covering stories that supported women's rights, including a piece on Robin Wright of the Netflix series House of Cards demanding the same salary as Kevin Spacey. In 2013, Carlson became the first cable news television anchor to go on air with no makeup. Just three weeks before she was fired, she came forward in support of the assault weapons ban.

During her tenure at Fox News Carlson covered multiple world events including both the first and second inauguration of Barack Obama, the Wedding of Prince William and Catherine Middleton, and the Democratic National Convention and Republican National Convention in 2008 and 2012.

2016–present

Miss America Organization 

On January 1, 2018, Carlson was elected chairwoman of the board of directors of the Miss America Organization, a volunteer position. Shortly after joining as chairwoman, Carlson's first major decision was to remove the swimsuit competition from the pageant, following a unanimous vote from the board of directors. Carlson's goals were to transition the pageant into "Miss America 2.0", where the swimsuit competitions would be replaced with on-stage interviews. The move aimed to shift focus from appearances to achievements, in light of the Me Too movement. The move divided opinion mostly within the organization.

In early 2019, it was announced that the Miss America brand would return to NBC. After securing the network deal, Carlson resigned from Chairwoman of the Board in June 2019.

Other television and media 
In April 2018, Carlson reached a first-look development deal with A&E Networks, under which she would host three documentary specials across its channels, such as Lifetime. Gretchen Carlson: Breaking the Silence focuses on the every woman story of workplace sexual harassment and premiered on Lifetime on January 14, 2019.

In May 2018, Carlson was a correspondent on an episode of the television documentary series America Divided, which airs on Epix. Carlson produced her episode with Norman Lear, titled "Washington's War on Women" about sexual harassment on Capitol Hill.

Carlson also hosted Live PD Presents: Women on Patrol and Escaping Polygamy on Lifetime in 2018. In August 2019, it was announced that Carlson would host two hourlong documentaries from the "Beyond the Headlines" franchise. The first called Escaping the NXIVM Cult: A Mother's Fight to Save Her Daughter, and the second The College Admissions Scandal.

In December 2019, Carlson wrote an opinion article in The New York Times, stating that she still cannot disclose what happened to her due to a nondisclosure agreement, but that it was her desire to be able to do so.

In January 2020, Carlson announced a new television deal with Blumhouse Productions to produce a new interview style series.

In October 2020, it was announced that Carlson would join PEOPLE (the TV Show!) as a special contributor. In the new program from PeopleTV, Carlson will highlight everyday American heroes.

In April 2021, Carlson and her life story was featured on the PBS television program Finding Your Roots in order to explore her family genealogy. It was shown through investigative and DNA research that she is a full-blooded Scandinavian-American, and that much of her family originated in Småland, Sweden.

Ending Forced Arbitration of Sexual Assault and Sexual Harassment Act

Me Too movement 

On July 6, 2016, Carlson filed a sexual harassment lawsuit against Fox News chairman Roger Ailes in the Superior Court of New Jersey and confirmed on her Twitter account that she was no longer with Fox News. In her complaint, Carlson alleged that she was fired from her program for refusing Ailes's sexual advances. Ailes at the time claimed the accusations were false, while the law firm representing Carlson claimed ten other women had contacted them to speak of Ailes' behavior at Fox News and throughout his television career.

Carlson's allegations received widespread media coverage. After Carlson came forward, six more women spoke to Gabriel Sherman of New York magazine, alleging that Ailes had sexually harassed them and that Ailes "spoke openly of expecting women to perform sexual favors in exchange for job opportunities". Shortly thereafter, Carlson sat down for an interview with John Koblin of The New York Times, saying, "I wanted to stand up for other women who may be facing similar circumstances."

As the case progressed, Carlson reached out directly to her fans, thanking them in a series of Twitter videos and offering her support for fellow victims of sexual harassment. She also criticized Fox's attempt to force her claims to be adjudicated via closed-door mandatory arbitration rather than in court. Fox filed court papers arguing that Carlson was compelled by her contract to adjudicate her claims in arbitration. Carlson said: "Forcing victims of sexual harassment into secret arbitration proceedings is wrong, because it means nobody finds out what really happened."

After Ailes resigned on July 21, 2016, Carlson said she felt "relief that now I would be believed", though she also "felt angry that it took so long" for Ailes to step down. Eight days later, her Fox program The Real Story aired its final episode.

On September 6, 2016, 21st Century Fox announced that it had settled the lawsuit with Carlson for $20 million. As part of the settlement, 21st Century Fox apologized to Carlson, saying, "We sincerely regret and apologize for the fact that Gretchen was not treated with the respect and dignity that she and all of our colleagues deserve."

Philanthropy and public work 

Since her harassment complaint became public, Carlson has focused her public work to modify laws that protect predators. In December 2017, she joined a bipartisan coalition of legislators to introduce the Ending Forced Arbitration of Sexual Assault and Sexual Harassment Act, which voids forced arbitration agreements that prevent sexual harassment survivors from getting their day in court. Co-sponsors of the bill were Senators Kirsten Gillibrand (D-NY) and Lindsey Graham (R-SC) and Representatives Cheri Bustos (D-IL) and Elise Stefanik (R-NY). The bill was reintroduced in the House in February 2019. Carlson testified before the House Judiciary Committee in May, 2019. In February 2022, the U.S. Congress passed the Ending Forced Arbitration of Sexual Assault and Sexual Harassment Act, which excludes sexual assault and sexual harassment complaints from arbitration clauses, including retroactively. The law was championed by Carlson, who was sexually harassed for many years by then Chairman and CEO of Fox News, Roger Ailes. On March 3, 2022, President Joe Biden signed the bill into law during a ceremony where Carlson was introduced by Vice President Kamala Harris. Carlson spoke about her 5 year journey to pass the bill on behalf of all survivors and then introduced President Biden to sign the bill. When the President signed the bill into law, Carlson was flanked by other survivors as well as the bipartisan coalition of Congressional members who supported the bill. After signing the bill into law, President Biden handed the pen used to Carlson.

Carlson created the Gift of Courage Fund in 2017 and partnered with the nonprofit organization All In Together to create the Gretchen Carlson Leadership Initiative, (GCLI) a program meant to "bring civic leadership and advocacy training to thousands of underserved women across the country, with a special focus on empowering women who have experienced gender-based violence, discrimination, or harassment." The initiative has hosted 13 community engagement workshops since its founding. In 2018, Carlson's Gift of Courage Fund also supplied the grant to create the Gretchen Carlson March of Dimes Advocacy Fellows, a program that selected 20 women from across the country to become more civically involved in promoting legislation and policies benefitting women and children. More recently, Carlson created the non-profit organization Lift Our Voices with the mission of eradicating arbitration clauses in employment contracts and non-disclosure agreements (NDAs) that serve to silence women and men in the workplace.

Carlson is a longtime supporter of Miss You Can Do It, a pageant with an emphasis "not on looks but courage". Founded by Abbey Curran, a former Miss Iowa USA winner who was born with cerebral palsy, the pageant honors girls and young women who live with special needs and challenges. It was the subject of an HBO documentary in 2013. In 2016, Carlson served as the pageant's MC. When its organizers fell short of their fundraising goals (threatening the cancellation of the pageant), Carlson volunteered to cover the remaining expenses. On social media, the pageant thanked her for "saving Miss You Can Do It".

Carlson serves on the March of Dimes National Board as a trustee, the Catherine Violet Hubbard Foundation Gala Committee, The Advisory Committee for the Michelle Clayman Institute for Gender Research at Stanford University and the Advisory Committee of The Press Forward. She is also a member of Women Moving Millions, a global collective of women making unprecedented gifts of $1 million or more for the advancement of women and girls.

In 2017, Carlson was named one of Time magazine 100 Most Influential People in the World, was the recipient of the prestigious Matrix Award, and was named to Variety Most Powerful Women of Impact list. In 2018, she received the 2018 YWCA Phenomenal Woman Award and the New York National Organization for Women (NOW) Women of Power and Influence Award. In 2020, Carlson received the Sandra Day O'Connor Lifetime Achievement Award from the Arizona Foundation for Women. In July 2020, Carlson headlined a panel with Bethenny Frankel on how global emergencies affect philanthropic priorities for Town & Country's 2020 Philanthropy Summit.

Lift Our Voices 
At The Hollywood Reporter 2019 Women in Entertainment ceremony, Carlson spoke about her lawsuit against Fox News over sexual harassment and announced her new anti-nondisclosure agreements initiative, Lift Our Voices, (LOV) which she founded with former Fox News colleagues Julie Roginsky and Diana Falzone. The organization advocates for laws banning the use of arbitration clauses in employment contracts and confidentiality agreements in sexual harassment settlements. The initiative focuses on NDA's solely dealing with toxic workplace environment issues like sexual harassment, not those protecting trade secrets.

In November 2020, lawsuits discovered by Business Insider found that multiple women had stated in legal filings that Michael Bloomberg, the former New York City mayor and presidential candidate, fostered a toxic, fraternity-like culture at his company during the 1990s. Carlson's organization LOV asked every Presidential candidate to sign on to supporting Lift Our Voices in January 2020. Every candidate did except for President Donald J. Trump, Senator Bernie Sanders, Senator Amy Klobuchar and Bloomberg. Soon thereafter, Carlson's organization wrote an op-ed in The Des Moines Register encouraging the debate moderators in Iowa to ask the Democratic presidential candidates about their stance on NDAs. The question did appear on the debate and after appearing in his first and only presidential debate, Bloomberg ended his campaign partly due to the heavy scrutiny surrounding the topic of NDAs.

In 2021, Carlson and Roginsky, along with Cher Scarlett, a labor activist in tech, wrote an essay for The Olympian encouraging Washington State Legislature to pass a bill Scarlett had worked with on with House Representative Liz Berry and Senator Karen Keiser to expand protections for workers facing unlawful conduct in the workplace, disallowing employers from enforcing NDAs in cases of discrimination, assault, and harassment.

In popular culture 

Gretchen Carlson has appeared on magazine covers ranging from Good Housekeeping to Time. Vanessa Bayer regularly impersonated Carlson during her tenure on NBC's Saturday Night Live. Jon Stewart dedicated an entire segment to Carlson on The Daily Show criticizing her for dumbing herself down to connect with the Fox News audience who he says, "sees intellect as an elitist flaw".

The Loudest Voice miniseries 

In 2019, Carlson's career at Fox News was portrayed on the Showtime miniseries, The Loudest Voice. Her role as co-anchor at Fox News was depicted by actress Naomi Watts. Watts stated in interviews that the story of Carlson was "inspiring" and that she dealt with multiple scenarios with "dignity and grace".

Other cast members included Russell Crowe as Roger Ailes, Seth MacFarlane as Brian Lewis and Sienna Miller as Beth Tilson. The fifth episode in the series portrayed the deteriorating working relationship between Carlson and Ailes from 2012 onwards. Many incidents were portrayed to the public for the first time, since Carlson was unable to speak directly about the events, due to a confidentiality clause in the settlement between her and Fox News.

The series aired the audio recordings taken by Carlson during her time at Fox News for the first time. The recordings were of various incidents at Fox where Carlson was sexually harassed by Ailes and other colleagues at Fox News. The show also follows the incidents leading up to Carlson reporting the sexual harassment she received. The Loudest Voice then portrayed her demotion and the events that followed her filing the internal complaint, many of which were recorded. The recordings went on to play a major part in the settlement negotiations between Carlson and Fox News.

Bombshell film

Bombshell, a film portraying Carlson's career at Fox News, was released on December 13, 2019. Carlson is played by Nicole Kidman, with other cast members including Margot Robbie as Kayla Pospisil (a composite character), Charlize Theron as Megyn Kelly, and John Lithgow as Roger Ailes. The film follows events at Fox News in the run-up to Ailes resigning from the organization after being exposed for sexual harassment.

Awards and recognition

Awards
Cover of Time magazine's October 2016 issue
Cover of Good Housekeeping magazine's January 2017 issue
Time magazine's 100 Most Influential People In The World in 2017
2017 New York Women in Communications Matrix Award
2017 National Employment Lawyers Association Courage Award
2017 American Association of Justice Award 
2018 "Champion for Change" Award at the Los Angeles Young Women's Christian Association Phenomenal Women Awards
2018 Women of Power and Influence Award at the National Organization for Women
NOW NYC Women of Courage Award 2018
Texas Trailblazer Award 2017 from Family Place Domestic Violence Center in Dallas 
CAPS community service award - Long Island, NY 2018
RTNDA (Radio, Television, Newspaper, Digital Association) 1st Amendment Award in DC 2019
Center for Safety and Change Courage award 40th anniversary 2019
Sandra Day O'Connor Lifetime Achievement Award — Arizona Foundation For Women 2020

Speeches

TEDWomen 2017: "How we can end sexual harassment at work"
TED Conversation with Chris Anderson and David Brooks (2017)
The Forbes Women's Summit 2017
Fortune Most Powerful Women 2018
Women in the World 2017
S.H.E. Summit 2017
92nd Street Y 2017
AdWeek Matrix Awards 2017
Cannes Lions International Festival of Creativity (2018)
National Employment Lawyers Association Convention (NELA)(2017)
American Association of Justice (2017)
Nat'l Assoc of Women Lawyers 2018
The Temple Emanu-el Streicker Center Panel Discussion with Joy Behar (2017)
Verizon Top Female Executives 2017
The Center for Sexual Assault Crisis and Education
Tory Burch Foundation Embrace Ambition Summit 2020
Drexel University (2017)
Brunswick School for Boys (2017)
Stanford University (2018)
Harvard College (2018)
University of Southern California (2018)
Duke University (2018)
Yale Law School (2019)

Personal life 
On October 4, 1997, Carlson married sports agent Casey Close. They live in Greenwich, Connecticut, with their two children.

She announced on Fox & Friends on June 9, 2009, and repeated on Glenn Beck's Fox News program, that her parents' car dealership had been selected for closure as part of the General Motors reorganization and bankruptcy. A year later, the Minneapolis Star Tribune reported that "It took an act of Congress, a national TV appeal and maybe a little bit of history on the owners' side, but Main Motor, the Anoka car dealership that Lee and Karen Carlson's family has owned for 91 years, will keep its General Motors dealership after all."

Carlson remains an advocate of the arts from her experience as a child violinist. Both of Carlson's children are pianists. At the age of 9, Carlson's daughter organized a solo piano recital in their hometown of Greenwich, Connecticut to raise money for charity. Shortly after the Sandy Hook elementary school shooting, Kaia's recital raised $5,000 for an animal sanctuary started in honor of victim Catherine Violet Hubbard. Today she serves on the teenage advisory board.

As a string instrumentalist in her youth, Carlson had admired cellist Yo-Yo Ma, whom she eventually met when they both spoke at the 2019 Dreamforce Conference in San Francisco.

Bibliography
In 2015, Carlson released her first book, Getting Real, a bestselling inspirational memoir about her life growing up in Minnesota, her violin career, Miss America experience and television career.

In 2017, Carlson released her second book, Be Fierce: Stop Harassment And Take Your Power Back. The book discussed as much of Carlson's story at Fox News as she was allowed to comment on because of the NDA she signed, but also many other stories of sexual harassment in the workplace from women who reached out to Carlson after her story became public. The profits from the book, a New York Times bestseller, go to the Gift of Courage Fund.

Carlson has appeared in two TED talks, one discussing women's rights and sexual harassment in the workplace, and the other discussing the hyper-partisan political times we live in and how we might come together as a nation to solve issues.

 Carlson, Gretchen: Getting Real. New York City: Viking, 2015. .
 Carlson, Gretchen: Be Fierce: Stop Harassment and Take Your Power Back. Center Street, 2017. .

References

External links

 
 Gretchen Carlson on Instagram
 Gretchen Carlson on Facebook
 Gretchen Carlson on Twitter
 
 Gretchen Carlson: How we can end sexual harassment at work Talk at TEDWomen 2017, November 2017
 

1966 births
Living people
2017 in Internet culture
2017 in women's history
20th-century American journalists
20th-century American women musicians
20th-century classical violinists
21st-century American journalists
21st-century American women writers
Activists from Minnesota
American classical violinists
American human rights activists
American Lutherans
American people of Swedish descent
American social activists
American television news anchors
American women philanthropists
American women television journalists
Anoka High School alumni
CBS News people
Child classical musicians
Classical musicians from Minnesota
Fox News people
Journalists from Minnesota
Miss America winners
Miss America 1980s delegates
Miss America Preliminary Talent winners
Musicians from Greenwich, Connecticut
People from Anoka, Minnesota
Sexual abuse victim advocates
Sexual harassment in the United States
Stanford University alumni
Women classical violinists
Women human rights activists
20th-century American violinists